The 1937–38 Ljubljana Subassociation League was the 19th season of the Ljubljana Subassociation League. Čakovec won the league for the first time.

Ljubljana subdivision

Maribor subdivision

Final

References

External links
Football Association of Slovenia 

Slovenian Republic Football League seasons
Yugo
Slovenia
Football
Football